This is a list of towns and villages in County Mayo, Ireland.

A
 Achill Sound
 Attymass

B
 Balla
 Ballina
 Ballindine
 Ballinrobe
 Ballintubber
 Ballycastle
 Ballycroy
 Ballyhaunis
 Ballyglass
 Bangor
 Belcarra
 Bellacorick
 Bellavary
 Belmullet
 Bohola
 Bonniconlon
 Breaffy
 Brickens

C
 Carracastle
 Carrowteige
 Castlebar
 Charlestown
 Claremorris
 Cong
 Corroy
 Crossmolina

D
 Dooagh

F
 Foxford

G
 Glenamoy
 Gweesalia

H
 Hollymount

I
 Islandeady
 Irishtown

K
 Keel
 Kilkelly
 Killala
 Kilmaine
 Kilmovee
 Kiltimagh
 Knockmore
 Knock

L
 Lahardane
 Louisburgh

M
 Mayo
 Moylaw
 Mulranny
 Murrisk

N
 Newport

P
 Partry
 Pollagh
 Pontoon
 Portacloy

R
 Rossport

S
 Shrule
 Swinford

T
 Tourmakeady
 Turlough

W
 Westport

References

Towns and villages in County Mayo
Towns and villages